Mamadou Koné (born 6 March 1974) is a Burkinabé former footballer who played as a defender for US des Forces Armées and EF Ouagadougou. He made 30 appearances for the Burkina Faso national team from 1995 to 2000. He was also named in Burkina Faso's squad for the 1996 African Cup of Nations tournament.

References

External links
 

1974 births
Living people
Burkinabé footballers
Association football defenders
Burkina Faso international footballers
1996 African Cup of Nations players
US des Forces Armées players
Étoile Filante de Ouagadougou players
Place of birth missing (living people)
21st-century Burkinabé people